Manuel López Zarza (born 26 April 1932) better known as Manuel Zarzo is a Spanish film actor. He has appeared in more than 150 films since 1951.

Selected filmography

 Day by Day (1951)
 Love in a Hot Climate (1954)
 Cursed Mountain (1954)
 The Fisher of Songs (1954)
 The Song of the Nightingale (1959)
 The Showgirl (1960)
 The Delinquents (1960)
 The Balcony of the Moon (1962)
 Weeping for a Bandit (1964)
 The 317th Platoon (1965)
 It's Your Move (1968)
 The Pizza Triangle (1970)
 The Legend of Frenchie King (1971)
 My Dear Killer (1972)
 The Two Faces of Fear (1972)
 Ricco the Mean Machine (1973) 
 Dick Turpin (1974)
 Naked Therapy (1975)
 Unmarried Mothers (1975)
 Ambitious (1976)
 Nightmare City (1980)
 La colmena (1982)
 Stico (1985)
 El hermano bastardo de Dios (1986)
 Tiovivo c. 1950 (2004)

External links

1932 births
Living people
Spanish male film actors
Male actors from Madrid
20th-century Spanish male actors